The House That Swift Built is a 1982 Soviet fantasy comedy film directed by Mark Zakharov based on the eponymous play by Grigori Gorin about Irish satirist writer and Anglican priest Jonathan Swift.

Plot
A doctor arrives at a mentally unstable house, looking to reveal the truth of a famous writer, Jonathan Swift. Swift is surrounded by actors playing out the life in the house, somehow causing his mental illness and even slightly lost his grip on reality (so do other people think). The summary of this challenging story to comprehend is that the movie is about coping mentally with what is actually going on around you.

Cast
Oleg Yankovsky - Jonathan Swift
Aleksandr Abdulov - Richard Simpson, Doctor
Vladimir Belousov - Patrick, servant-secretary
Yevgeny Leonov - Glum, the giant
Marina Ignatova - Vanessa
Alexandra Zakharova - Stella (Esther Johnson)
Alexander Sirin - Mr. Someone, Struldbrugg
Aleksandr Zbruyev - Relb, Lilliputian
Nikolai Karachentsov - Flim, the Lilliputian
Tatyana Rudina - Betty, wife of Relb
Viktor Proskurin - Jack Smith, constable
Yuri Astafiev - Constable
Villor Kuznetsov - main Laputian
Vsevolod Larionov - Bigs, the judge
Semyon Farada - Governor
Yuri Kolychev - Bishop
Valery Belyakov - city dweller
Vyacheslav Gorbunchikov - city dweller
Evgeny Markov - participant of the meeting with the governor
Vladimir Myshkin - city dweller
Igor Fokin - spectator with binoculars
Olegar Fedoro - Laputian
Vladimir Fyodorov - dwarf with a gun (uncredited)

References

External links

1982 comedy films
1982 films
1980s fantasy comedy films
Soviet fantasy comedy films
Films directed by Mark Zakharov
Films scored by Gennady Gladkov
Studio Ekran films
Jonathan Swift
1980s Russian-language films